Lavr Georgiyevich Kornilov (– 13 April 1918) was a Russian military intelligence officer, explorer, and general in the Imperial Russian Army during World War I and the ensuing Russian Civil War. Kornilov was of Siberian Cossack origin. Today he is best remembered for the Kornilov Affair, an unsuccessful endeavor in August/September 1917 that was intended to strengthen Alexander Kerensky's Provisional Government, but which led to Kerensky eventually having Kornilov arrested and charged with attempting a coup d'état, and ultimately undermined Kerensky's rule.

Kornilov escaped from jail in November 1917 and subsequently became the military commander of the anti-Bolshevik Volunteer Army which took the charge of anti-Bolshevik opposition in the south of Russia. He and his troops were badly outnumbered in many of their encounters, and he was killed by a shell on 13 April 1918 while laying siege to Ekaterinodar, the capital of the Kuban Soviet Republic.

Pre-revolutionary career

One story relates how Kornilov was originally born as a Don Cossack Kalmyk named Lorya Dildinov and adopted in Ust-Kamenogorsk, Russian Turkestan (now Kazakhstan) by the family of his mother's brother, the Russian Cossack Khorunzhiy Georgy Nikolayevich Kornilov, whose wife was of Kazakh origin. But his sister wrote that he had not been adopted, had not been a Don Cossack, and that their mother had Polish and Altai Oirot descent. (Though their language was not a Kalmyk/Mongolian one, but because of their Asian race and their history in the Jungar Oirot (Kalmyk) state, Altai Oirots were called Altai Kalmyks by Russians. They were not Muslims or Kazakhs.) But Boris Shaposhnikov, who served with Pyotr Kornilov, the brother of Lavr, in 1903, mentioned the "Kyrgyz" ancestry of their mother - this name was usually used in reference to Kazakhs in 1903. Kornilov's Siberian Cossack father was a friend of Potanin (1835-1920), a prominent figure in the Siberian autonomy movement.

Kornilov entered military school in Omsk in 1885 and went on to study at the Mikhailovsky Artillery School in St. Petersburg in 1889. In August 1892 he was assigned as a lieutenant to the Turkestan Military District, where he led several exploration missions in Eastern Turkestan, Afghanistan and Persia, learned several Central Asian languages, and wrote detailed reports about his observations.

Kornilov returned to St. Petersburg to attend the Nikolayev General Staff Academy and graduated as a captain in 1897. Again refusing a posting at St. Peterburg, he returned to the Turkestan Military District, where he resumed his duties as a military intelligence officer. Among his missions at this post was an attempt at traveling incognito to British India in 1904, though he was quickly discovered and subsequently kept under close surveillance.

During the Russo-Japanese War of 1904-1905 Kornilov became the Chief of staff of the 1st Infantry Brigade, and was heavily involved in the Battle of Sandepu (January 1905) and the Battle of Mukden (February/March 1905). He was awarded the Order of St. George (4th class) for bravery and promoted to the rank of colonel.

Following the end of the war, Kornilov served as military attache in China from 1907 to 1911. He studied the Chinese language, travelled extensively (researching data on the history, traditions and customs of the Chinese, which he intended to use as material for a book about life in contemporary China), and regularly sent detailed reports to the General Staff and Foreign Ministry. Kornilov paid much attention to the prospects of cooperation between Russia and China in the Far East and met with the future president of China, Chiang Kai-shek. In 1910 Kornilov was recalled from Beijing but remained in St. Petersburg for only five months before departing for western Mongolia and Kashgar to examine the military situation along China's border with Russia. On 2 February 1911 he became Commander of the 8th Infantry Regiment of Estonia and was later appointed commander of the 9th Siberian Rifle Division, stationed in Vladivostok.

In 1914, at the start of World War I, Kornilov was appointed commander of the 48th Infantry Division, which saw combat in Galicia and the Carpathians. In 1915, he was promoted to the rank of major general. During heavy fighting, he was captured by the Austrians in April 1915, when his division became isolated from the rest of the Russian forces. After his capture, Field Marshal Conrad, the commander of the Austro-Hungarian Army, made a point of meeting him in person. As a major general, he was a high-value prisoner of war, but in July 1916 Kornilov managed to escape back to Russia and return to duty.

After the abdication of Tsar Nicholas II, he was given command of the Petrograd Military District in March 1917.  On 8 March, Kornilov placed the Empress Alexandra and her children under house arrest at the Alexander Palace (Nicholas was still held at Stavka), replacing the Tsar's Escort and Combined Regiments of the Imperial Guard with 300 revolutionary troops. But when the Provisional Government declined to give him the authority he sought to deal with indiscipline, he was transferred at his request to command the Russian Eighth Army. His army inflicted a spectacular defeat on the Austrians, taking ten thousand prisoners - Russia's only notable military success in the year 1917 - though after five days, was forced to retreat. On 24 July, he was appointed commander of the southern front. A week later, he replaced Aleksei Brusilov as Supreme Commander-in-Chief of the Provisional Government's armed forces.

Kornilov Affair

In the mass discontent following the July Days, the Russian populace grew highly skeptical about the Provisional Government's abilities to alleviate the economic distress and social resentment among the lower classes. Pavel Milyukov, the Kadet leader, describes the situation in Russia in late July as, "Chaos in the army, chaos in foreign policy, chaos in industry and chaos in the nationalist questions".Kornilov, appointed commander-in-chief of the Russian army in July 1917, considered the Petrograd Soviet responsible for the breakdown in the military in recent times and believed that the Provisional Government lacked the power and confidence to dissolve the Petrograd Soviet. Following several ambiguous correspondences between Kornilov and Alexander Kerensky, Kornilov commanded an assault on the Petrograd Soviet.

Because the Petrograd Soviet was able to quickly gather a powerful army of workers and soldiers in defence of the Revolution, Kornilov's coup was an abysmal failure, and he was placed under arrest. The Kornilov Affair resulted in significantly increased distrust among Russians towards the Provisional Government.

Russian Civil War

After the alleged coup collapsed as his troops disintegrated, Kornilov and his fellow conspirators were placed under arrest in the Bykhov jail. On 19 November, a few weeks after the proclamation of Soviet power in Petrograd, they escaped from their confinement (eased by the fact that the jail was guarded by Kornilov's supporters) and made their way to the Don region, which was controlled by the Don Cossacks. Here they linked up with General Mikhail Alekseev. Kornilov became the military commander of the anti-Bolshevik Volunteer Army with Alekseev as the political chief.

The Kornilov Shock Detachment of the 8th Army was the most famous and longest-lived volunteer unit in the Russian Imperial Army. It was also the last regiment of the Russian Imperial Army and the first of the Volunteer Army. In late 1917, the Kornilov Shock Regiment, one of the crack units of the Volunteer Army, was named after him, as well as many other autonomous White Army formations, such as the Kuban Cossack Kornilov Horse Regiment. Kornilov's forces became recognizable for their Totenkopf insignia, which appeared on the regiment's flags, pennants, and soldiers' sleeve patches.

Even before the Red Army was formed, Lavr Kornilov promised, "the greater the terror, the greater our victories." He vowed that the goals of his forces must be fulfilled even if it was needed "to set fire to half the country and shed the blood of three-quarters of all Russians." In the Don region village of Lezhanka alone, bands of Kornilov's officers killed more than 500 people. On the other hand, Kornilov's adjutant recalled that the general "loved only the [Russia] itself" and served it for all his life, having no time to think about political systems. The Bolsheviks for him were dangerous traitors, who ruined Russia's unity and had to be stopped.

On 24 February 1918, as Rostov and the Don Cossack capital of Novocherkassk fell to the Bolsheviks, Kornilov led the Volunteer Army on the epic 'Ice March' into the empty steppe towards the Kuban. Although badly outnumbered, he escaped destruction from pursuing Bolshevik forces and laid siege to Ekaterinodar,  the capital of the Kuban Soviet Republic, on 10 April. However, in the early morning of 13 April, a Soviet shell landed on his farmhouse headquarters and killed him. He was quietly buried in nearby Gnadau (modern day Dolinovskoe).

A few days later, when the Bolsheviks gained control of the village, they unearthed Kornilov's coffin, dragged his corpse to the main square and burnt his remains on the local rubbish dump.

Memorials 
In 13 April 2013, a monument to the late General was erected in Krasnodar. Commemoration ceremonies took place with local cossacks, along with Cossacks from Don, Stavropol and Taman.

Honours and awards
Order of St. Stanislaus, third degree (1901), 2nd degree (1904 and 1906 with swords)
Order of St. Anne, 3rd degree (1903) and 2nd degree (6 December 1909)
Order of St. George, 4th degree (9 August 1905) and 3rd degree (28 April 1915)
Gold Sword for Bravery (9 May 1907)
 Badge of the 1st Kuban (Ice) campaign (3 October 1918), issued posthumously, No.1 out of 3,689

References

Bibliography
Asher, Harvey. "The Kornilov Affair: A Reinterpretation." Russian Review (1970) 29#3 pp: 286-300. in JSTOR
 Grebenkin, I. N. "General L.G. Kornilov: A Rough Sketch for a Character Portrait." Russian Studies in History 56.3 (2017): 188-211.
Katkov, George. Russia 1917, the Kornilov Affair: Kerensky and the Break-up of the Russian Army (Longman, 1980)
Mawdsley, Evan. The Russian Civil War (2008)
Moncure, James A. ed. Research Guide to European Historical Biography: 1450-Present (4 vol 1992) 3:1082-90
White, James D. "The Kornilov affair—a study in counter‐revolution," Europe‐Asia Studies (1968) 20#2 pp 187–205.
 Yang, Ho-Hwan. "Different Ways of Interpreting the Kornilov Affair: A Review of George Katkov's The Kornilov Affair: Kerensky and the Break-up of the Russian Army, London and New York: Longman, 1980" The SNU Journal of Education Research (1993) pp  17–28. online

External links

 

1870 births
1918 deaths
People from Oskemen
People from Semipalatinsk Oblast
Commanders-in-chief of the Russian Army
Cossacks from the Russian Empire
People of the Russian Civil War
Recipients of the Gold Sword for Bravery
Recipients of the Order of Saint Stanislaus (Russian), 2nd class
Recipients of the Order of St. Anna, 2nd class
Recipients of the Order of St. George of the Third Degree
Russian Provisional Government generals
Russian military personnel of the Russo-Japanese War
Generals of the Russian Empire
Anti-communists from the Russian Empire
Explorers from the Russian Empire
Russian military personnel killed in action
Russian military personnel of World War I
World War I prisoners of war held by Austria-Hungary
Prisoners of war from the Russian Empire
Russian Empire escapees
White movement generals
Kalmyk people
Military attachés of the Russian Empire
Posthumous executions